KNPB (channel 5), branded on-air as PBS Reno, is a PBS member television station in Reno, Nevada, United States, owned by Channel 5 Public Broadcasting, Inc. The station's studios are located on North Virginia Street in Reno, and its transmitter is located on Red Hill between US 395 and SR 445 in Sun Valley.

History
In 1964, following authorization of federal matching grants for the construction of non-commercial educational television facilities, there was a proposal for a state network of educational television stations offering television programming originating from Las Vegas. The proposal was opposed by educators in other parts of the state of Nevada, and the Clark County School District's trustees gave up the proposal of a statewide service in 1966. KLVX signed on the air in March 1968 to serve Southern Nevada; Reno would not receive a public television station of its own until 1983. During that time, PBS programming was made available to Northern Nevada from the city's commercial stations on a per-program basis (i.e. Sesame Street was on KOLO). Cable systems in northwestern Nevada (Reno, Carson City) and northeastern California piped in KVIE in Sacramento, which was available over-the-air in the extreme western portions of the market. Northeastern Nevada, including Elko, was served by KUED in Salt Lake City, which also operated several over-the-air translators in the region; northeastern Nevada is part of the Salt Lake City market.

KNPB began broadcasting on September 29, 1983, with the first program being Sesame Street. The station's studios and offices were located in the College of Education building on the campus of the University of Nevada, Reno.

In 1995, KNPB moved into its current facility on Virginia Street, also on the university campus. The station's main transmitter is located on Red Peak in Sun Valley. A low-power digital translator, licensed as KNPB-LD and also broadcasting on channel 15, serves the communities surrounding Lake Tahoe and the Truckee, California region from a location on the flanks of Mt. Rose. A network of other community translators retransmit KNPB's signal across much of northern Nevada and bordering portions of California.

KNPB Online went active on September 29, 1997.

Programming
Programs presented by KNPB include Wild Nevada and Beauty of Oil Painting with Gary and Kathwren Jenkins.

Technical information

Subchannels
The station's digital signal is multiplexed:

Analog-to-digital conversion
KNPB was the first television station to offer digital broadcasts on September 29, 2000. The station shut down its analog signal, over VHF channel 5, on February 17, 2009, the original date in which full-power television stations in the United States were to transition from analog to digital broadcasts under federal mandate (which was later pushed back to June 12, 2009). The station's digital signal remained on its pre-transition UHF channel 15. Through the use of PSIP, digital television receivers display the station's virtual channel as its former VHF analog channel 5.

Translators

References

External links
 

PBS member stations
Television channels and stations established in 1983
1983 establishments in Nevada
NPB
Low-power television stations in the United States